Blennerhassett is an English surname.

Origin

The name originates from the village of Blennerhasset (with one t) in Cumbria, England.

People with the surname
Arthur Blennerhassett (1687–1758), Anglo-Irish lawyer, politician and judge
Arthur Blennerhassett (1719–1799), Anglo-Irish politician
Arthur Blennerhassett (1799–1843), Irish politician
Charlotte, Lady Blennerhassett (1843–1917), German writer and biographer
Conway Blennerhassett (1693–1724), Irish politician
Harman Blennerhassett (1765–1831), Anglo-Irish aristocrat, plantation owner in western Virginia
John de Blennerhassett (1350–1384), English politician
John Blennerhassett (English MP) (by 1521–1573), English landowner and member of parliament
John Blennerhassett (judge) (c.1560–1624), Anglo-Irish judge and politician
John Blennerhassett (died 1677), Anglo-Irish politician
John Blennerhassett (died 1709), Anglo-Irish politician
John Blennerhassett (1691–1775), Anglo-Irish politician
John Blennerhassett (1715–1763), Anglo-Irish politician
John Blennerhassett (1769–1794), Anglo-Irish politician
John Blennerhassett (politician) (1930–2013), Irish politician
Margaret Agnew Blennerhassett (1771–1842), English-American poet and aristocrat
Richard Blennerhassett (1889–1957), Australian Anglican priest
Robert Blennerhassett (MP for Tralee) (c.1622–c.1689), Anglo-Irish soldier and politician
Robert Blennerhassett (1652–1712), Irish lawyer and politician
Sir Rowland Blennerhassett, 1st Baronet (1741–1821), Anglo-Irish lawyer
Sir Rowland Blennerhassett, 4th Baronet (1839–1909), Anglo-Irish politician
Rowland Ponsonby Blennerhassett (1850–1913), Irish politician
Rowland Blennerhassett (priest) (1919–2009), Irish priest, Archdeacon of Tuam 1956–69
Thomas Blennerhassett, English politician

See also
Blennerhassett, West Virginia, USA
Blennerhassett Island, West Virginia, USA
Blennerhassett Island Historical State Park
Blennerhassett Island Bridge
Blennerhassett (opera)
Blennerhassett baronets

English toponymic surnames